The Centre Chorégraphique National de Nantes is a  dance company based in Nantes, France.

Claude Brumachon and Benjamin Lamarche were the co-directors of the company. Ambra Senatore became director in 2016.

References 
  

Nantes
Dance companies